Frank Meschkuleit (born 1962) is a Canadian voice actor, puppeteer and comedian known for his role as Toopy on the Canadian television series Toopy and Binoo.

Meschkuleit began his performing career as a mime, and broke into puppeteering with an audition for the 1979 film The Muppet Movie and parts in Don't Eat the Neighbours and Dragon. He was also the suit performer for Junior Gorg in the fifth and final season of Fraggle Rock.

Meschkuleit performed a live comedy show called The Left Hand of Frank, which was a hit at the Edmonton International Fringe Festival in 1994. Meschkuleit performed the show for 12 years, ending in 2005.

Meschkuleit will be reprising his role as Toopy for the upcoming feature flim called Toopy And Binoo: The Movie that is schedule to release in theaters on August 11, 2023.

Selected filmography 
 Fraggle Rock (1983–1987)
 Sesame Street Presents: Follow That Bird (1985)
 Blizzard Island (1987-1988)
 Basil Hears a Noise (1990)
 Chicken Minute (1990-1993)
 Iris, The Happy Professor (1992–1994)
 Little Star (1994-1997)
 Noddy (1998–2000)
 St. Bear's Dolls Hospital (1998-2000)
 Don't Eat the Neighbours (2001–2002)
 Dragon (2004–2007)
 Toopy and Binoo (2005–2006)
 The Mighty Jungle (2007-2008)
 Toopy and Binoo Vroom Vroom Zoom (2013)
 Now You Know (2015-2016)
 Fraggle Rock: Back to the Rock (2022)
 Toopy And Binoo: The Movie (2023)''

References

External links 
 

1962 births
Living people
Canadian male voice actors
Fraggle Rock performers
Male actors from Toronto
Canadian puppeteers